André Marius Jørgensen Hofstøl (born April 9, 1979) is a Norwegian handball player, currently playing for Danish Handball League side AaB Håndbold. Before joining AaB, Jørgensen played for the Spanish team CD Bidasoa.

Jørgensen is a regular member of the Norwegian national handball team, having made more than 100 appearances during his career.

External links
 
 

1979 births
Living people
Norwegian male handball players